The Secret Society of Super Villains is a team of fictional supervillains appearing in American comic books published by DC Comics. Over the years, they have featured a large number of ne'er-do-wells as they attempt to subvert the superheroic population of the world for a variety of schemes.

This page lists the known members of the Secret Society of Super Villains:

Darkseid's Society
These members of the Secret Society of Super Villains were secretly gathered by Darkseid when the group was first founded in 1976 through their splintering after the discovery of their benefactor's true identity. Since then, various leaders like Lex Luthor, the Wizard and the Silver Ghost have taken over or re-formed the Society, including old and new members in the roster.

{{columns-list|colwidth=30em|
 Darkseid 
 Captain Boomerang (Digger Harkness) 
 Captain Cold 
 Captain Comet
 Copperhead
 Gorilla Grodd 
 Manhunter (Paul Kirk clone)
 Mirror Master (Sam Scudder) 
 Shadow Thief
 Sinestro
 Star Sapphire (Deborah Camille "Debbie" Darnell) 
 Wizard 
 Hi-Jack
 Lex Luthor 
 Captain Stingaree
 Funky Flashman
 Matter Master
 Felix Faust 
 Trickster (James Jesse) 
 Creeper
 Bizarro (Pre-Crisis only) 
 Poison Ivy 
 Angle Man (Pre-Crisis only)
 Floronic Man
 Blockbuster (Mark Desmond) 
 Professor Zoom the Reverse-Flash 
 Silver Ghost
 Killer Moth 
 Quakemaster
 Sizematic Twins
 Cavalier
 Chronos (David Clinton) 
}}

In JLA #119 (late Nov. 2005), it was revealed that Catwoman was an early member of the SSoSV briefly as well (Catwoman was mentioned in the text of Secret Society of Super Villains #1 as being a member, though the penciller omitted her from the issue; this brief mention is the only known connection of Catwoman to the SSoSV prior to the present). Also, Despero brought the memories of the members back, and was responsible of the subsequent attack of the Society.

The Ultra-Humanite's Society
The next incarnation of the Secret Society was organized by the Ultra-Humanite, who organized foes of both the Justice League of America and the Justice Society of America.

 Ultra-Humanite 
 Brain Wave 
 Monocle 
 Psycho-Pirate (Roger Hayden)
 Rag Doll (Peter Merkel) 
 Cheetah (Deborah Domaine)
 Floronic Man
 Killer Frost (Crystal Frost)
 Mist 
 Signalman

Underground
When the JLA resurfaced with the Big Seven members, Brain Wave started to gather a new Secret Society to take down the newly formed Justice League (JLA 80-Page Giant #1), but Brainwave was actually the Martian Manhunter in disguise—the formation of this Society was a trap made by the League to defeat more supervillains in the same time (as the tale was told by the Rainbow Raider to Sonar III, it is uncertain whether this tale actually happened; at the very least, there may have been some embellishment).

Members gathered by "Brainwave" were:

 Amos Fortune 
 Black Hand 
 Blockbuster (Roland Desmond)
 Bolt
 Captain Boomerang (Digger Harkness)
 Cheetah (Barbara Ann Minerva)
 Cheshire
 Crazy Quilt
 Deadshot
 Doctor Alchemy
 Doctor Phosphorus
 Doctor Sivana
 Fiddler
 Floronic Man
 Gorilla Grodd
 Heat Wave
 Hector Hammond
 Killer Frost (Louise Lincoln)
 Major Disaster
 Monocle
 Per Degaton
 Penguin
 Poison Ivy
 Prankster
 Psycho-Pirate (Roger Hayden)
 Rainbow Raider
 Riddler
 Royal Flush Gang (minus King)
 Scarecrow
 Signalman
 Solomon Grundy
 Sonar
 Star Sapphire (Carol Ferris)
 Wizard

Members in other branches that are on TV screens:
 Captain Cold
 Felix Faust
 Goldface
 Kobra
 Metallo
 Mister Mind
 Rainbow Raider
 Ra's al Ghul
 Two-Face
 Vandal Savage

Alexander Luthor Jr.'s Society
Organized by Alexander Luthor Jr. in the guise of Lex Luthor, the Society formed over rumors of the JLA mindwiping Dr. Light. With a ruling council of six members overseeing a structured roster of 200 strong (Villains United #1), the Society is a grave threat to the superheroes of the world. Joker is notably absent from this roster, because he is the only villain the other villains all feared — and rightly so, as the Joker murdered several of the Society's roster in revenge for being left out.

The Society's council
 Lex Luthor (Alexander Luthor Jr. in disguise, leader)
 Black Adam (betrayed by the Society)
 Talia al Ghul
 Doctor Psycho
 the Calculator
 Deathstroke the Terminator

Members of the Society

Possible members
The following had declined to join the Society:

 Catman (became a member of the Secret Six)
 Creeper
 Kite Man
 A Manhunter (either Mark Shaw or Kate Spencer)

Deceased members
 An unidentified Hyena was executed as an example in Villains United #3.
 Doctor Polaris exploded after being subject to the exposed form of an irate Human Bomb toward the beginning of Infinite Crisis #1.
 Fisherman was gunned down by detectives Marcus Driver and Josie MacDonald in Gotham Central #37.
 High-ranking members of the Gotham branch of the Royal Flush Gang were seemingly taken out by the Joker in Infinite Crisis #2.
 Rag Doll (Peter Merkel) was killed by Johnny Sorrow in JSA Classified #7.
 Black Mask was shot by Catwoman in Catwoman #52.
 Crispus Allen (as the Spectre) struck down Star Sapphire (Deborah Camille "Debbie" Darnell) in the first half of Infinite Crisis #6.
 Psycho-Pirate had his Medusa Mask forcibly pushed through his skull by Black Adam during the finale of Infinite Crisis #6.
 Amos Fortune had half of his face blown off in Villains United #6, surviving only to be thrown from a moving helicopter in Villains United: Infinite Crisis Special before absorbing energy and exploding in JSA Classified #16.
 Deuce Canyard (an aspiring "Jack" of the Royal Flush Gang) was sniped by the warden of Enclave M in Villains United: Infinite Crisis Special.
 Baron Blitzkrieg was incinerated by Superboy-Prime's heat vision during the Battle of Metropolis.
 Alexander Luthor, Jr. received severe acid and electrocution burns to the face from the Joker before getting shot by him, in the presence of the real Lex Luthor, in the final pages of Infinite Crisis #7.
 In the novelization, Doctor Spectro is a member as well of the Society and dies in the same explosion that killed Solomon Grundy and the Bloodlines heroes.
 In an interview with DC editor-in-chief Dan DiDio, he confirms that Boss Moxie did indeed die in Infinite Crisis #7 by stating that Superboy-Prime snapped his neck.

The Wizard's Society
Some former members of the Wizard's Secret Society, also victims of the JLA's mindwiping in the past, had their memories unlocked by Despero and then were summoned back together for revenge by the Wizard. Zatanna reluctantly re-erased their memories of the JLA's identities. Whether they were members of Alexander Luthor Jr.'s Society as well is unknown.

In addition to the Wizard, Felix Faust and Chronos, the membership included:

 Floronic Man
 Star Sapphire (Deborah Camille "Debbie" Darnell)
 Matter Master

One Year Later
One year after the events of Infinite Crisis, the Calculator has taken control of the Society, with Talia as the only other original leader left. Felix Faust and the Cheetah (Barbara Ann Minerva), however, have also been linked to this group.

Libra's Society
In the lead-up to Final Crisis'', the returned supervillain Libra (who happens to be the prophet of Darkseid) takes the scattered remnants of Luthor's Secret Society and uses it to create his own Secret Society of Super Villains to serve Darkseid. The following are confirmed members so far.

Leader
 Libra

Inner Circle
 Doctor Sivana
 Gorilla Grodd
 Lex Luthor
 Ocean Master
 Talia al Ghul
 Vandal Savage

Membership
 Black Manta
 Chronos
 Clayface (Basil Karlo)
 Cyborgirl
 Deathstroke the Terminator
 Doctor Polaris
 Giganta
 Human Flame
 Icicle (Cameron Mahkent)
 Key
 Killer Croc
 Killer Frost (Louise Lincoln)
 Metallo
 Parasite (Rudy Jones)
 Shadow Thief
 Shatterfist
 Shrike
 Zoom

Former membership
 Doctor Light (killed by the third Spectre)
 Effigy (melted by the third Spectre)
 Hangmen (all five killed by the third Spectre before they can swear allegiance to Libra)
 Breathtaker
 Killshot
 Provoke
 Shock Trauma
 Stranglehold
 Rogues (all five withdrew from the Society)
 Abra Kadabra
 Captain Cold
 Heat Wave
 Mirror Master
 Weather Wizard
 New Rogues (all five killed by the Rogues)
 Burn
 Chill 
 Mirror Man
 Mister Magic
 Weather Witch

Members turned into Justifiers
 Gorilla Grodd
 Human Flame
 Killer Croc
 Man-Bat
 Silver Swan (Vanessa Kapatelis)
 Typhoon

The Cheetah's Society
Following the Final Crisis, the Cheetah has assembled another Secret Society of Super Villains. Among its members are:

 Crime Doctor (Anica Balcescu)
 Doctor Poison (Marina Maru)
 Felix Faust
 Firefly
 Genocide
 Mammoth
 Phobia
 Professor Ivo
 Red Volcano
 Shrapnel
 T. O. Morrow

The New 52'''s Society==
In The New 52, the Secret Society of Super Villains is reintroduced in issues of Justice League of America when "the Outsider" is seen assembling them to deal with the growing superhero community, as well as to have members he can offer to the Crime Syndicate of America to assist them once they arrive. First appearance and any additional info listed in parenthesis.

==DC Rebirths Society==
The DC Rebirth reboot featured the Secret Society of Super Villains, where they place Deathstroke the Terminator on trial to see if he is still evil or not.

The lineup consists of:Chairpersons' Vandal Savage (leader)
 Lex Luthor (former member)
 Ultra-Humanite
 Hector Hammond
 Professor Zoom the Reverse-Flash
 Killer Frost
 Black Manta
 Deadline
 Raptor
 Riddler
== Infinite Frontier''’s Society 
 Deathstroke (leader) 
 Angle Man (Angelo Bend)
 Black Spider (Eric Needham)
 Body Doubles
 Bug-Eyed Bandit
 Calculator (former member)
 Count Vertigo
 Copperhead II
 Crazy Quilt (Paul Dekker)
 Crime Doctor (Bradford Thorne)
  Deadline (former member) 
 Doctor Destiny
 Doctor Moon (former member) 
 Doctor Phosphorus
 Dollmaker (Barton Mathis)
 Felix Faust
 Flamingo
 Firefly
 Gentleman Ghost
 Giganta (former member)
 Girder
 Goldface
 Gunsmith
 Hellhound
 Hyena (Summer Day)
 Kanjar Ro
 Key
 Lion-Mane
 Mad Dog (Rex)
 Merlyn
 Monocle (former member) 
 Multiplex
 Neutron
 Nocturna
 Phobia
 Prankster
 Prometheus
 Psimon
 Raptor
 Scavenger (Peter Mortimer)
 Scream Queen
 Shadow Thief (Carl Sands)
 Shaggy Man I
 Shrapnel
 Silver Banshee
 Skorpio
 Slipknot
 Tattooed Man (Abel Tarrant)
 Trident
 Typhoon
  Toyman (Hiro Okamura)
 Warp

References

External links
 Secret Society of Super Villains profile at DC Cosmic Teams
 The Society profile at DC Cosmic Teams
 Secret Society of Super Villains at the Comics Archive

Secret Society of Super Villains members
Secret Society of Super Villains